Wander Over Yonder is an American animated television series that aired on Disney Channel and Disney XD. Created by Craig McCracken, it follows the adventures of the optimistic Wander, who rides across the galaxy to help the inhabitants of various planets live freely despite the intentions of Lord Hater to rule the universe.

The series premiered on Disney Channel on August 16, 2013. New episodes were moved during its first season to Disney XD on March 31, 2014. The series ran for two seasons with the final episode airing June 27, 2016.

Plot
The series follows Wander, a nomadic, helpful, and overly-optimistic intergalactic traveller and his best friend and steed, Sylvia the Zbornak, as they travel from planet to planet helping people to have fun, play, and live free, despite the continuing encroachment of Lord Hater, one of the most powerful villains in the galaxy, and his army of Watchdogs.

The show's first season is episodic; there are very few strong ties between episodes, and they can be viewed independently of each other. In the second season, however, a more sequential story is introduced; as Lord Dominator begins to conquer the galaxy, the show's tone becomes more serious and the focus moves from stopping the rather incompetent Lord Hater to stopping the extremely competent Lord Dominator. As a result, the episodes are more closely linked and there are several developments in the overarching plot.

Episodes

Characters

Main
 Wander (voiced by Jack McBrayer) – Wander is optimistic, good-hearted, outgoing, energetic, and occasionally annoying to the more level-headed people around him. He aspires to explore different worlds and help people have fun and live free, in opposition to the evil reign of Lord Hater and his army of Watchdogs. Given to his positive attitude and beliefs, Wander is often oblivious and inattentive to danger as well as Hater's cruel and aggressive nature. Wander is a short, orange-furred being of an indeterminate species. He is usually seen with a big floppy green hat with a black band above the brim and a yellow star on the band. The inside of his hat, which acts as storage, is a portal to some form of "Hammerspace".  Wander describes his hat as "magic", and it appears to have some level of sentience, in that provides him with whatever he needs (although not necessarily what he wants) most at any given moment. In "The Greater Hater", it is implied that Wander is not his real name; later in "The Waste of Time", it is revealed that he took the name after being called a "wandering weirdo" by Sylvia. The same episode reveals that he previously wandered through a galaxy in which he was known as Tumbleweed, where he interfered with resident villain Major Threat, eventually turning him to good.
 Sylvia (voiced by April Winchell) – Sylvia is Wander's steed and best friend, who explores and travels the universe with him. She enjoys fighting, and though her rough nature can cause her to come off as ill-tempered, quarrelsome, inconsiderate, and reckless at times, she also has a softer side. Sylvia initially showed skepticism to the notion of herself and Wander defeating Lord Hater, saying that Wander "would have to be crazy to stop Lord Hater", and she continues to show trepidation in encountering Hater's minions and forces. Sylvia is blue with a long neck, a long tail, stubby arms, and big expressive eyes. While she is sometimes referred to as Wander's horse, she is actually one of a species called a "Zbornak", more similar to a dinosaur than a horse. Her family consists of her mother Dorothy, her three brothers Bill, Gil, and Phil, and her grandmother; her father also appeared in a photograph.
 Lord Hater (voiced by Keith Ferguson) – Lord Hater is a skeleton being with electrical powers clad in a red-and-black hooded robe. Hater is the ruler of the Hater Empire and Wander's self-proclaimed nemesis. He is a power-hungry, evil, and cruel dictator and conqueror, while at the same time being a childish, petty, temperamental, and emotionally unstable egotist. He hates being told what to do by those he declares lower than himself, including his own second-in-command Peepers. What he desires most is absolute rule of the entire universe under his fist and no one to stand in his way or disrespect him. However, he displays a pathological hatred towards Wander (the complete opposite of everything that he is) due to his superfluous optimism, his obliviousness to Hater's evil, and his infuriating ability to foil every scheme of Hater's without even trying. He refers to himself as the Duke of Destruction, the Monarch of Mayhem, and the Greatest in the Galaxy.
 Commander Peepers (voiced by Tom Kenny) – Commander Peepers is a Watchdog (distinguished by his helmet's frill and extended lightning bolt) who is Lord Hater's chief henchman and seems to be willing to do anything Lord Hater commands. He is far more focused than Hater, sensing danger and concocting schemes ahead as Lord Hater mostly ignores him, though he has a tendency to underestimate Wander's capacity to foil Hater's plans.

Recurring
 The Watchdogs (various voices) – The Watchdogs are small eyeball-headed creatures that serve as Hater's minions and the bulk of his army. They are loyal to their master, but are frequently distracted by Wander's interference, particularly as their "enemy" treats them better than their ruler. Many episodes of the show focus on the Watchdogs, showing that they are all unique individuals. Westley (Aziz Ansari) (Appearing in "The Little Guy), who left the Hater Empire to travel the galaxy after being inspired by Wander and Sylvia. Andy (Andy Daly) (Appearing in "Eye on the Skullship") runs a web series for the Watchdogs, in which he interviews them and allows them to discuss their lives on Lord Hater's Skullship.
 Captain Tim (voiced by Fred Tatasciore) - Captain Tim is an arachnomorph, a vicious spider like creature reminiscent of Xenomorphs, first seen in "The Pet". Wander named him after seeing him spit out the nametag of the ship's former captain. Realizing that he and Sylvia were unable to take care of the creature, they gave him to Lord Hater as a pet.
 Emperor Awesome (voiced by Sam Riegel) – Emperor Awesome is a preening, flamboyant cool-dude shark-headed man and one of Lord Hater's greatest rivals in universal conquest. He considers Sylvia attractive. In "The Party Animal", it is revealed that Emperor Awesome can destroy planets through excessive partying. In "The Rival", he attempts to get Lord Dominator to date him by offering a super secret weapon, only to anger her once she realizes it is a hoax. In "My Fair Hatey", he is shown imprisoned alongside most of Dominator's other rival villains, and even after being rescued, is left anxiety-riddled at the very mention of Lord Dominator's name.
 Fist Fighters – The Fist Fighters are the fist-headed minions of Emperor Awesome.
 Lord Dominator (voiced by Fred Tatasciore in masked form, Noël Wells in unmasked form) – Lord Dominator is a villain with lava-based abilities who is Lord Hater's rival as the "Greatest in the Galaxy" in the second season. Her disguised form was first seen as a silhouette in the Season 2 poster and later in "The Rider" animation laughing maniacally. In "The Battle Royale", Wander, Lord Hater, and the other villains find out that Lord Dominator is a woman. Though Lord Hater develops a crush on her, Dominator does not return his feelings. In "My Fair Hatey", it is revealed that Dominator has defeated and imprisoned nearly all of her villain competitors on her ship as she begins her plan to destroy the galaxy. As a result of Commander Peepers' freeze weapon affecting her ship and not defeating her, Lord Dominator gained power over not only lava and fire, but also snow and ice, making her more powerful than ever. In the series finale, Lord Dominator attempts to destroy the last planet left in the galaxy, and is defeated once and for all when Lord Hater destroys her ship, causing her robot army to deactivate and her powers (tied to the ship's core) to disappear. After being saved by Wander's bubble and rejecting his offer of friendship, Dominator storms off still bubbled, vowing revenge.  
 Dominator-Bots – The Dominator-Bots (Often shortened to "Dom-Bots") are Lord Dominator's magma-based, orb-shaped robots that serve as her foot soldiers. There are three types of Dominator-Bots: The first type is a class of smaller bots, generally seen patrolling Dominator's ship. The second type is similar, but is much larger and more powerful.  Finally, there are bots used for reconnaissance; in "The Bot", we see that these bots scan planets to find Volcanium X that Lord Dominator can use to power her ship. This type of bot is shown to be capable of independent thought, as one of the bots befriends Wander.

Development and broadcast
Craig McCracken, creator of Wander Over Yonder, previously helmed the Cartoon Network series The Powerpuff Girls and Foster's Home for Imaginary Friends. Wander Over Yonder is McCracken's first and only foray on a Disney-owned network. McCracken's wife Lauren Faust served as co-producer and story editor for the first season. The eponymous character made his debut on sketchbooks, clothes, and patches that McCracken sold at conventions, as well as in a never-finished graphic novel. McCracken described Wander as a "nomadic, hippie, muppet man". He also said that his approach to each episode was character-driven and that the show's use of color is influenced by Hanna-Barbera.

The series made its formal premiere on the Disney Channel on September 13, 2013. A sneak peek was screened at the 2012 San Diego Comic-Con International. An early preview of the first episode, "The Picnic", was aired on the network on August 16, 2013, following the premiere of Phineas and Ferb: Mission Marvel.

Premieres of new episodes were moved to sister network Disney XD during its first season, on March 31, 2014. Shortly after, Disney Television Animation executive Eric Coleman announced that the series was renewed for a second season, with comic book writer ND Stevenson joining the writing team. This season premiered on August 3, 2015, with "The Greater Hater", a special half-hour episode. A set of 11 one-minute shorts were produced in promotion of this season premiere; the network released them starting in July.

Internationally, Wander Over Yonder made its premiere on Family Channel in Canada on October 13, 2013, on Disney XD in Australia on June 9, 2014, on Disney Channel in Israel on September 1, 2014, and on Disney Channel in the UK and Ireland on March 10, 2014.

Reception
The previewed episode was seen by roughly 2.9 million viewers.

The A.V. Clubs Kevin McFarland wrote that the series continues the "zany legacy" of the Cartoon Network's "golden age" on a competing network. Emily Ashby of Common Sense Media describes the series as flash and funny, stating it would "appeal to kids." She also argued it is a series that "generates laughs in opposing personalities, nonstop action, and silly scenarios."

Awards and nominations

References

External links

 
 Wander Over Yonder on Disney+
 
 

 
2010s American animated television series
2013 American television series debuts
2016 American television series endings
2010s American comic science fiction television series
American children's animated comic science fiction television series
Annie Award winners
Disney Channel original programming
Disney XD original programming
English-language television shows
Space Western television series
Television series by Disney Television Animation
Television series created by Craig McCracken
Television series set on fictional planets
Interstellar travel in fiction
Animated television series about extraterrestrial life